The 2022–23 season is the 65th in the history of FC Slovan Liberec and their 30th consecutive season in the top flight. The club will participate in the Czech First League and the Czech Cup.

Players

Out on loan

Pre-season and friendlies

Competitions

Overall record

Czech First League

League table

Results summary

Results by round

Matches 
The league fixtures were announced on 22 June 2022.

Czech Cup

References

FC Slovan Liberec seasons
Slovan Liberec
2022 in Czech sport
2023 in Czech sport